Goldsboro may refer to:

Places in the United States and Canada
Goldsboro, Florida
Goldsboro, Maryland
Goldsboro, North Carolina
Goldsboro High School
Goldsboro, Ohio
Goldsboro, Pennsylvania
Goldsboro, Texas
Goldboro, Nova Scotia

Other uses
Goldsboro (band), a rock music group featuring musician Kevin Roentgen

People with the surname
Bobby Goldsboro, singer
William Goldsboro, Canadian marathon runner

See also
 Goldsborough (disambiguation)
 1961 Goldsboro B-52 crash